The 2003 Alcântara VLS accident was an accident during the Brazilian Space Agency's third attempt to launch the VLS-1 rocket, which was intended to launch two satellites into orbit. The rocket ignited on its launch pad at the Alcântara Launch Center, killing 21 people.

Background
The rocket, proposed in 1979 had until the accident two launch attempts: one in 1997, which ended up in the Atlantic Ocean due to the failure of one of the first stage engines to start and another in 1999, destroyed remotely due to a flame penetrating the top of the second stage block 3 minutes after takeoff.

Operation São Luís
Besides being the third flight of the VLS-1, the operation had as objectives the launch of the satellites UNOSAT and SATEC in to orbit; verify the CLA's ability to perform type launches and the use of the CLBI as a tracking station. The transportation of materials for V03 started on August 23, 2002 and stopped on April 16, 2003. The operation was restarted on July 1, an inspection the next day found no problems, and the satellites were transported on the 30th. After several assembly operations, the accident occurred on August 22, 2003.

Accident
The accident occurred three days before the scheduled launch date, at 1:26:06 pm (Brasília time) on August 22, 2003, between frames 26 and 27 recorded by the Closed Circuit TV of the Mobile Integration Tower. An unplanned ignition destroyed the launch vehicle while on the CLA platform. 21 people died due to the ignition of a first stage engine. It took about eight seconds before the tower was enveloped by smoke and gases heated up to 3,000 °C. The mobile tower stood upright for five minutes.

Survivors reported the noise of at least one booster running and several loud bangs.

Due to the scale of the event, the dead were identified through a roll call and the remains were identified and sent to the IML on August 23, 2003. On the same day, the base was reopened to the press.

At the same time that the accident occurred, the president of AEB Luiz Bevilacqua, was giving a press conference about the agreement signed between Brazil and Ukraine for the use of the Alcântara base. Being informed of the accident by journalists, he ironically said, "Only if it's a St. John's rocket". It was identified that the ignition process occurred prematurely, and thus the launch tower was not removed in time, which was the main cause of the fire.

None of the actions performed on the day posed any risk and the accident considerably delayed the Brazilian space program.

Investigation

The Military Police Inquiry was opened on August 26, 2003, and the Technical Investigation Commission was appointed on August 28, 2003. The investigation involved Russia at the request of the Ministry of Defense, and was answered by sending six technicians from the Russian Aerospace Agency. The families of the victims have even called for an independent investigation, something that the then president Lula has not commented on, but he has announced that he would send a bill to compensate the victims' families. A Special Commission of the House of Representatives visited the base on October 20. The compensation was approved by the House on October 28, 2003. Despite evidence of French espionage in Maranhão, no evidence of sabotage was found.

The conclusion of both the Brazilian and Russian investigators was that the cause of the accident was due to the unplanned start of the A-booster. Among the possible causes of the ignition, they raised the possibility of static electricity, with the Russian experts noting the absence of a bridge between the propellant and the propellant housing, but it was considered a low probability event due to the non-occurrence of lightning on the day. The electrostatic discharge hypothesis was found to be superior, due to the absence of a barrier between the first stage boosters.

Results
The integration tower, which cost R$6.5 million in 1995, cost R$10 million to repair. The launch tower was completed and delivered in 2012, but in 2013 the base had not yet finished its reconstruction. A mock-up of the VLS-1 was tested on the tower in 2012, But in 2016 it was decided to end the VLS program in favor of the VLM. The VLS-1 V04 even had 70% of its structure completed, but was canceled with the end of the program.

Victims
The accident killed 21 civilians who were working at the time of the fire.

Amintas Rocha Brito, 47, engineer
Antonio Sergio Cezarini, 47, engineer
Carlos Alberto Pedrini, 45, engineer
Cesar Augusto Costalonga Varejão, 49, engineer
Daniel Faria Gonçalves, 20, mechanic
Eliseu Reinaldo Vieira, 46, engineer
Gil Cesar Baptista Marques, 44, cameraman
Gines Ananias Garcia, 46, engineer
Jonas Barbosa Filho, 37, technician
José Aparecido Pinheiro, 39, technician
José Eduardo de Almeida, 38, cameraman
José Eduardo Pereira II, 43, technician
José Pedro Claro da Silva, 51, engineer
Luis Primon de Araújo, 45, engineer
Mario Cesar de Freitas Levy, 43, engineer
Massanobu Shimabukuro, 43, technician
Mauricio Biella Valle, 42, engineer
Roberto Tadashi Seguchi, 46, engineer
Rodolfo Donizetti de Oliveira, 35, technician
Sidney Aparecido de Moraes, 38, technician
Walter Pereira Junior, 45, technician

See also
 List of spaceflight-related accidents and incidents

References

Bibliography

External links 
FSP: New tests postpone VLS-1 V04 launch (in Portuguese)
BBC: A scaled down VSV-30 launch successfully
BBC: Brazil vows to pursue space plan
SpaceDaily article on explosion
Official accident investigation report (in Portuguese)

2003 in spaceflight
2003 in Brazil
Space program of Brazil
Satellite launch failures
Maranhão
Space program fatalities
Filmed deaths